St John Brodrick may refer to:

 Sir St John Brodrick (1627–1711), Irish MP
 St John Brodrick (1659–1707), Irish MP
 St John Brodrick (died 1728), Irish MP
 St John Brodrick, 1st Earl of Midleton (1856–1942), Irish politician